Greip  or Saturn LI is a natural satellite of Saturn. Its discovery was announced by Scott S. Sheppard, David C. Jewitt, Jan Kleyna, and Brian G. Marsden on 26 June 2006, from observations taken between 5 January and 1 May 2006.
Greip is about 6 kilometres in diameter, and orbits Saturn at an average distance of 18,066 Mm in 906.556 days, at an inclination of 172.7° to the ecliptic (159.2° to Saturn's equator), in a retrograde direction and with an eccentricity of 0.3735, and is presumably at high risk of eventually colliding with Phoebe. It is unknown whether Greip is more similar to Suttungr or Hyrrokkin in color. Its rotation period is most likely  hours with two minima in the light curve, but a longer period of 19 hours cannot be ruled out due to the short observation time by Cassini–Huygens.

It is named after Greip, a giantess in Norse mythology.

References

 Institute for Astronomy Saturn Satellite Data
 IAUC 8727: Satellites of Saturn June 30, 2006 (discovery)
 MPEC 2006-M45: Eight New Satellites of Saturn June 26, 2006 (discovery and ephemeris)
 IAUC 8873: Satellites of Saturn September 20, 2007 (naming)

Norse group
Moons of Saturn
Irregular satellites
Discoveries by Scott S. Sheppard
Astronomical objects discovered in 2006
Moons with a retrograde orbit